Ashton is a village in Lee County, Illinois, United States. The population was 972 at the 2010 census, down from 1,142 in 2000.

History
Ashton was originally called Ogle Station, but it was afterwards changed in order to avoid confusion with Ogle County, Illinois. A tornado hit the town on April 9, 2015 at 6:40 pm CDT.

Geography

Demographics

As of the census of 2000, there were 1,142 people, 437 households, and 312 families residing in the village. The population density was 1,727.6 people per square mile (668.1/km). The racial makeup of the village was 97.99% White, 1.05% African American, 0.09% Native American, 0.35% from other races, and 0.53% from two or more races. Hispanic or Latino of any race were 2.36% of the population.

There were 423 households, out of which 35.2% had children under the age of 18 living with them, 54.2% were married couples living together, 14.4% had a female householder with no husband present, and 28.4% were non-families. 23.3% of all households were made up of individuals, and 11.0% had someone living alone who was 65 years of age or older. The average household size was 2.57 and the average family size was 2.98.

In the village, the population was spread out, with 27.5% under the age of 18, 8.4% from 18 to 24, 29.9% from 25 to 44, 19.6% from 45 to 64, and 14.5% who were 65 years of age or older. The median age was 36 years. For every 100 females there were 90.7 males. For every 100 females age 18 and over, there were 87.3 males.

The median income for a household in the village was $39,896, and the median income for a family was $43,750. Males had a median income of $33,750 versus $22,381 for females. The per capita income for the village was $21,200. About 5.4% of families and 6.2% of the population were below the poverty line, including 3.8% of those under age 18 and 3.1% of those age 65 or over.

See also
William Moats Farm

References

External links
AshtonUSA - Official website for Ashton, Illinois

Villages in Lee County, Illinois
Villages in Illinois